Mahmoud Khorakchi (born 5 May 1970) is an Iranian professional futsal coach and former footballer.

Honours

Manager
 Iranian Futsal Super League
 Champion : 2007–08 (Tam Iran Khodro)
 Runners-up : 2005–06 (Tam Iran Khodro)
 Iranian Futsal Hazfi Cup
 Runners-up : 2013–14 (Misagh)

References 

1970 births
Living people
People from Tehran
Sportspeople from Tehran
Iranian footballers
Association football goalkeepers
Iranian men's futsal players
Futsal goalkeepers
Keshavarz players
Persepolis F.C. players
Machine Sazi F.C. players
Iranian futsal coaches
Persepolis FSC managers
Giti Pasand FSC managers
21st-century Iranian people